The Chronicle of Khuzestan (also spelled Khuzistan) is an anonymous 7th-century Nestorian Christian chronicle. Written in Syriac, it covers the period from the reign of the Sasanian ruler Hormizd IV to the fall of the Sasanian Empire (652). The chronicle was discovered by the Italian orientalist Ignazio Guidi (1844–1935), hence it is also known as Guidi's Chronicle or the Guidi Anonymous. It is thought by some to be a portion of a lost history written by Elias of Merv. It is an important source for the early Muslim conquests.

The Chronicle describes itself as "some episodes from the Ecclesiastica, that is, church histories, and from the Cosmotica, that is, secular histories, from the death of Hormizd son of Khusrau to the end of the Persian kingdom." The first part is a chronological outline of Sasanian and Nestorian history by the reigns of the Sasanian rulers from Hormizd IV to Yazdgerd III and the Nestorian patriarchs down to Maremmeh. The second part of the work is an account of the conversion of some Turks by Elias of Merv, the third a list of towns founded by Seleucus I and the legendary rulers Semiramis and Ninus and the fourth a brief outline of the geography of Arabia. Between the third and fourth parts there is a brief continuation of the first part detailing the fall of Susa and Shushtar to the Arabs.

Some geographical details suggest that the chronicle was written in Khuzestan, hence its conventional name. The latest datable event mentioned took place in 652, and the Chronicle must have been composed no later than the 660s. It is incomplete as it stands, having lost its beginning. Despite the reference to written sources, it is clear that the chronicler relied heavily on oral reports. He frequently employs phrases like "it is said that" and similar.

Notes

Sources

 
 

 
 
 

Texts in Syriac
Sasanian Empire
Nestorian texts
Khuzestan
Middle Eastern chronicles
History of Khuzestan Province